Vasudhaiva Kutumbakam is a Sanskrit phrase found in Hindu texts such as the Maha Upanishad, which means "The World Is One Family".
Vedic tradition mentions "Vasudhaiva Kutumbakam" meaning all living beings on the earth are a family.

Translation

History
अयं निजः परो वेति गणना लघुचेतसाम्। (Ayam Nijah Paro Veti Ganana Laghucetasam)
उदारचरितानां तु वसुधैव कुटुम्बकम्॥ (Udaracaritanam Tu Vasudhaiva Kutumbakam)

The original Verse appears in Chapter 6 of  Maha Upanishad VI.71-73., it is considered the most important moral value in the Indian society. This verse of Maha Upanishad is engraved in the entrance hall of the Parliament Of India.

Subsequent shlokas go on to say that those who have no attachments go on to find the Brahman (The One Supreme, Universal Spirit That Is The Origin And Support Of The Phenomenal Universe). The context of this verse is to describe as one of the attributes of an individual who has attained the highest level of spiritual progress, and one who is capable of performing his worldly duties without attachment to material possessions.

Influences
The text has been influential in the major Hindu literature that followed it. The popular Bhagvad Gita,  the most translated of the Purana genre of literature in Hinduism, for example, calls the Vasudhaiva Kutumbakam adage of the Maha Upanishad, as the "Loftiest Vedantic Thought".

Dr N. Radhakrishnan, former director of the Gandhi Smriti and Darshan Samiti, believes that the Gandhian vision of holistic development and respect for all forms of life; nonviolent conflict resolution embedded in the acceptance of nonviolence both as a creed and strategy; were an extension of the ancient Indian concept of Vasudhaiva Kutumbakam.

References In The Modern World
India's Prime Minister Narendra Modi used this phrase in a speech at World Culture Festival, organized by Art of Living, adding that "Indian culture is very rich and has inculcated in each one of us with great values, we are the people who have come from Aham Brahmasmi to Vasudhaiva Kutumbakam, we are the people who have come from Upanishads to Upgraha.(Satellite)."

It was used in the logo of the 7th International Earth Science Olympiad, which was held in Mysore, India in 2013. It was designed to emphasize on the integration of the Earth’s subsystems in the school curriculum. It was designed by R. Shankar and Shwetha B. Shetty of Mangalore University.

The theme and the logo for India’s G20 Presidency from December 1, 2022, till November 30, 2023 has a mention of “Vasudhaiva Kutumbakam” or “One Earth-One Family-One Future”. The logo was selected after scrutiny of 2400 pan-India submissions invited through a logo design contest.

See also
Unity In Diversity
Religious Syncretism
Hindutva
We Are The World
Yaadhum Oore Yaavarum Kelir

References

Bibliography

Further reading 
 

Sanskrit words and phrases
Hindu philosophical concepts